Apoptosis-inducing factor 1, mitochondrial is a protein that in humans is encoded by the AIFM1 gene on the X chromosome. This protein localizes to the mitochondria, as well as the nucleus, where it carries out nuclear fragmentation as part of caspase-independent apoptosis.

Structure 

AIFM1 is expressed as a 613-residue precursor protein that containing a mitochondrial targeting sequence (MTS) at its N-terminal and two nuclear leading sequences (NLS). Once imported into the mitochondria, the first 54 residues of the N-terminal are cleaved to produce the mature protein, which inserts into the inner mitochondrial membrane. The mature protein incorporates the FAD cofactor and folds into three structural domains: the FAD-binding domain, the NAD-binding domain, and the C-terminal. While the C-terminal is responsible for the proapoptotic activity of AIFM1, the FAD-binding and NAD-binding domains share the classical Rossmann topology with other flavoproteins and the NAD(P)H dependent reductase activity.

Three alternative transcripts encoding different isoforms have been identified for this gene. Two alternatively spliced mRNA isoforms correspond to the inclusion/exclusion of the C-terminal and the reductase domains. A pseudogene that is thought to be related to this gene has been identified on chromosome 10.

Function 

This gene encodes a flavoprotein essential for nuclear disassembly in apoptotic cells that is found in the mitochondrial intermembrane space in healthy cells. Induction of apoptosis results in the cleavage of this protein at residue 102 by calpains and/or cathepsins into a soluble and proapoptogenic form that translocates to the nucleus, where it effects chromosome condensation and fragmentation. In addition, this gene product induces mitochondria to release the apoptogenic proteins cytochrome c and caspase-9. AIFM1 also contributes reductase activity in redox metabolism.

Clinical significance 
Mutations in the AIFM1 gene are correlated with Charcot-Marie-Tooth disease (Cowchock syndrome). At a cellular level, AIFM1 mutations result in deficiencies in oxidative phosphorylation, leading to severe mitochondrial encephalomyopathy. Clinical manifestations of this mutation are characterized by muscular atrophy, neuropathy, ataxia, psychomotor regression, hearing loss and seizures.

Interactions 

AIFM1 has been shown to interact with HSPA1A.

Evolution 
Phylogenetic analysis indicates that the divergence of the AIFM1 and other human AIFs (AIFM2a and AIFM3)  sequences occurred before the divergence of eukaryotes. This conclusion is supported by domain architecture of these proteins. Both eukaryotic and eubacterial AIFM1 proteins contain additional domain AIF_C.

References

Further reading

External links 
 AIFM1 on the Atlas of Genetics and Oncology
 

Proteins